The Zbrojovka Z 5 Express was a car produced by Československá Zbrojovka in the 1930s. A more luxurious follow-on to the Z 4, the car was produced as both a sedan and sports car. 357 were produced between 1936 and 1938, including one used by Carol II of Romania and another by Alois Eliáš, Prime Minister of the Protectorate of Bohemia and Moravia.

Design
In 1933, Zbrojovka tested a prototype four-cylinder car as a larger and more luxurious follow-on to the Z 4. Power was transmitted to the rear wheels through a 3-speed manual gearbox. Drum brakes were fitted front and rear, and suspension was by lower wishbones and upper transverse leaf springs.

The car was produced in a number of body styles, including a two-door sedan which cost 37,500 Kčs and a two-seat sports car that cost over 50,000 Kčs.

Performance

Production
The car was announced in October 1935 at the Prague Motor Show and sales continued after the factory moved to military production from 1936, the last car being sold in 1938. 357 vehicles were manufactured.

Notable examples
 Carol II of Romania used an example with a body designed by Plachý.
 The National Technical Museum (Prague) has preserved the vehicle used by Alois Eliáš, Prime Minister of the Protectorate of Bohemia and Moravia.

References

Cars introduced in 1935
Cars of the Czech Republic
Front-wheel-drive vehicles